The Cyclus Open de Tênis was a professional tennis tournament played on outdoor clay courts. It was part of the Association of Tennis Professionals (ATP) Challenger Tour. It was held annually in Florianópolis, Brazil from 2006 to 2012.

Past finals

Singles

Doubles

References

External links
ITF Search

 
Cyclus Open de Tenis
Cyclus Open de Tenis
Tennis tournaments in Brazil